Dr Fox may refer to:

 Neil Fox (broadcaster) (born 1961), British radio and television presenter
 Liam Fox (born 1961), British Conservative Member of Parliament
 Dr. Fox effect, in educational psychology, named after the identity Dr. Myron L. Fox
 Dr. Fox, a character from Cartoon Network's Unikitty!